Walter Vielhauer (April 1, 1909 in Reutlingen - April 19, 1986 in Heilbronn) was a communist and anti-fascist of Heilbronn who was held captive by Nazi Germany before and during World War II.

He was first arrested in March 1933 and was held several weeks at the new concentration camp Heuberg. After his release, he continued his struggle against fascism and in autumn of 1933, he was arrested again. He was condemned to five and a half years in penintentiary, which he had to spend in solitary confinement. After serving his sentence, he was sent to various concentration camps, Welzheim, Dachau, Mauthausen and Buchenwald, where he was active with the Resistance activities there.

In June 1945, he was deployed by the United States Army as assistant of the lord mayor and was responsible for social affairs in Heilbronn until 1948.

Sources 
 Hitler als Hoffnungsträger. In: Heilbronn im nationalsozialistischen Deutschland 1933–1945 
 Buchenwald - Ein Konzentrationslager. Bericht der ehemaligen KZ-Häftlinge Emil Carlebach, Paul Grünewald, Helmut Röder, Willy Schmidt, Walter Vielhauer.  
 Trau! Schau! Wem? Dokumente zur Geschichte der Arbeiterbewegung im Raum Heilbronn/Neckarsulm 1844-1949.  
 Opfer von Terror und Verfolgung: Walter Vielhauer (1909–1986) 

1986 deaths
1909 births
People from Reutlingen
Communist Party of Germany politicians
Welzheim concentration camp survivors
Union of Persecutees of the Nazi Regime members
Dachau concentration camp survivors
Mauthausen concentration camp survivors
Buchenwald concentration camp survivors